This is a list of films which have placed number one at the weekend box office in Canada during 2003.

Weekend gross list

References

See also
List of American films — American films by year

Canada
2003
2003 in Canadian cinema